Gustavo Hernando Aguirre (born 8 April 1977 in Buenos Aires) is a retired Argentine athlete who specialised in the 400 metres. He competed at the 2000 Summer Olympics failing to qualify for the second round.

His 400 metres personal best of 46.18, set in 1999, is the standing national record. His 800 metres personal best is 1:47.23, set in 2007.

Competition record

References

1977 births
Living people
Athletes from Buenos Aires
Argentine people of Basque descent
Argentine male sprinters
Argentine male middle-distance runners
Athletes (track and field) at the 1995 Pan American Games
Athletes (track and field) at the 2000 Summer Olympics
Athletes (track and field) at the 2007 Pan American Games
Olympic athletes of Argentina
Pan American Games competitors for Argentina
21st-century Argentine people